The Alishan Range is a mountain range in the central-southern region of Taiwan. It is separated by the Qishan River from the Yushan Range, the tallest range in Taiwan, to the east of the Alishan Range. There is a famous Taiwanese song called "Alishan de Guniang" which is about a girl in the Alishan mountains. The name Ali Shan seems to be taken from the word "Alit", which in several Taiwanese indigenous languages means "ancestor mountain".

See also
 Alishan National Scenic Area
 Alishan Forest Railway

References

Mountain ranges of Taiwan